The 1999 Generali Open was a men's tennis tournament played on outdoor clay courts in Kitzbühel, Austria that was part of the Championship Series of the 1999 ATP Tour. It was the 44th edition of the tournament and was held from 26 July until 1 August 1999. Fifth-seeded Albert Costa won his second consecutive singles title at the event and his third in total.

Finals

Singles

 Albert Costa defeated  Fernando Vicente, 7–5, 6–2, 6–7(5–7), 7–6(7–4)
 It was Costa's 3rd singles title of the year and the 11th of his career.

Doubles

 Chris Haggard /  Peter Nyborg defeated  Álex Calatrava /  Dušan Vemić, 6–3, 6–7(4–7), 7–6(7–4)

References

External links
 ITF tournament edition details

Generali Open
Austrian Open Kitzbühel
Austrian Open